Notes is an album by Canadian jazz pianist Paul Bley and American drummer Paul Motian recorded in 1987 and released on the Italian Soul Note label.

Reception

The AllMusic review by Eugene Chadbourne awarded the album 3 stars, stating: "the tracks basically having the flatness and relative lack of detail of the album's cover illustration. These performances have a lingering quality, however, certain moments eventually acquiring magic like illuminations, even though it is all mere residue under the fingers of players who seemingly can create beauty in their sleep."  The Penguin Guide to Jazz said "Their interplay in the most demanding of improvisational settings is intuitive and perfectly weighted".

Track listing
 "Notes" (Paul Bley) – 4:16   
 "Batterie" (Carla Bley) – 4:38   
 "Piano Solo No.1" (Paul Bley) – 5:19   
 "West 107th Street" (Paul Motian) – 4:55   
 "Just Us" (Motian) – 4:26   
 "No.3" (Paul Bley) – 4:08   
 "Turns" (Paul Bley) – 4:40   
 "Ballad" (Paul Bley) – 2:31   
 "Excerpt" (Paul Bley) – 2:44   
 "Love Hurts" (Paul Bley) – 4:51   
 "Inside" (Paul Bley) – 5:16   
 "Finale" (Paul Bley) – 3:13   
 "Diane" (Ernö Rapée, Lew Pollack) – 4:11  
Recorded at Barigozzi Studio in Milano, Italy, on July 3 & 4, 1987.

Personnel
 Paul Bley – piano
 Paul Motian – percussion

References

Black Saint/Soul Note albums
Paul Bley albums
Paul Motian albums
1987 albums